was the pen-name of a novelist in Shōwa period Japan. Her real name was Nakazato Tsune.

Early life
Nakazato was born in Fujisawa city, Kanagawa prefecture and graduated from the Kanagawa Girls’ Higher School. When she was 17 years old she met Tatsuo Nagai and started writing, publishing multiple novellas before her marriage at age 19.

Literary career
In 1938, Nakazato became the first woman to win the prestigious Akutagawa Prize, with her short story Noriai bashi. After World War II, she came to be known for a number of works addressing the issue of international marriage, including Mariannu monogatari ("Maryann's Story", 1946) and Kusari ("Chain", 1959), which were drawn from her own daughter's marriage to an American.

Her novel Utamakura ("Song Pillow", 1973) was awarded the Yomiuri Prize. In 1974, she received the Japan Art Academy Prize, and became a member of that institution in 1983.

Nakazato was a resident of Zushi, Kanagawa from 1932 until her death due to colon cancer in 1987. Her grave is at the temple of Engaku-ji in Kamakura.

See also
 Japanese literature
 List of Japanese authors

References

1909 births
1987 deaths
20th-century Japanese novelists
Japanese women short story writers
People from Fujisawa, Kanagawa
People from Zushi, Kanagawa
Akutagawa Prize winners
Yomiuri Prize winners
Deaths from colorectal cancer
Deaths from cancer in Japan
Japanese women novelists
20th-century Japanese women writers
20th-century Japanese short story writers